Time Warp is a popular science-themed television program produced for the Discovery Channel in the United States, in which Jeff Lieberman, an MIT scientist, teacher, and artist, along with high speed camera expert Matt Kearney, use their high speed camera to examine everyday occurrences and singular talents.

Time Warp captured common everyday events and viewed them again in slow motion to uncover the many principles of physics. To do so, they examined things such as a drop of water, explosions (many of them), gunshots, ballet dancing, cornflour, shallow water diving, X games and sometimes some uncanny things like piercing one's cheek or standing on blades.

The high speed cameras were used at as low as 500 frame/second for capturing how dogs drink to as high as 40,000 frame/second for capturing bullets, breaking glass, etc. Speeds above 20,000 frame/second were shot in black and white as the amount of light needed to record in black and white is significantly lower than what's needed to record in color.

Home media
The entire Time Warp series is available on both DVD and Blu-ray sets, making it the first Discovery show to be fully released on Blu-ray. The truncated 3rd season was included in the Season 2 set (not noted on box). Bonus features include: deleted scenes (season 2 only), the pilot episode (Blu-ray season 1 only), and a recap of season 1.

Note: Episodes 13 (Cheerleading) and 14 (Trail Bikes) from season 1, were flipped from broadcast order on the Blu-ray set. Season 2 Disc 2, the episode listing is out of sequence. Episodes 6 & 7 are listed after episode 11. Disc 3 has 3rd-season episodes 2 & 3 flipped. Season 2 Blu-ray is out of print. The Blu-ray sets are region free.

See also 
 List of Time Warp episodes
 The Slow Mo Guys, a YouTube show of similar purpose.

References

External links 
 https://web.archive.org/web/20101028102739/http://www.trianglestudios.com/html/main.html
 Official Time Warp website
 Official Tech Imaging website
 

2008 American television series debuts
2009 American television series endings
Discovery Channel original programming